During the 2006–07 season, Red Star Belgrade participated in the 2006–07 Serbian SuperLiga, 2006–07 Serbian Cup, 2006–07 UEFA Champions League qualifying rounds and 2006–07 UEFA Cup.

Season summary
Red Star won their tenth double in this season.

Squad

Results

Overview

Serbian SuperLiga

Serbian Cup

UEFA Champions League

Second qualifying round

Third qualifying round

UEFA Cup

First round

See also
 List of Red Star Belgrade seasons

References

Red Star Belgrade seasons
Red Star
Serbian football championship-winning seasons